Staines & Lammas (Middlesex) Football Club is a football club based in the town of Staines-upon-Thames. The club is affiliated to the Middlesex Football Association. They play in the Surrey Premier County Football League of Surrey FA.

Etymology
The club is named after Staines, Middlesex and the Lammas harvest festival.

History
Staines Lammas Football Club was founded in 1926 and took its name from the park land adjacent to the River Thames in Staines, Middlesex (now known as Staines-upon-Thames).

In 1927 the Club became members of the Hounslow & District League and finished runners-up in Division 2 in 1929 earning promotion to Division 1. By 1932 the club were members of the South-West Middlesex League Division 1 and added a Reserve Team in Division 2 of the Richmond & District League. In 1936 the club were finalists in the Staines Hospital Cup. A year later the Club finished as champions of the South-West Middlesex League Division 1 and earned promotion to the Intermediate Division were they remained until after the Second World War. By 1948 the Reserve Team had switched to the Hounslow & District League Division 2. In 1955 the club also entered a team in Division 1 of the Staines & District League.

In the mid-1980s the Club moved to the Laleham Recreation Ground and changed its affiliation to the Woking League (which subsequently became the Guildford & Woking Alliance League) under the jurisdiction of the Surrey County Football Association. The Club remains affiliated to both the Middlesex and Surrey County Football Associations.

The club made steady progress through the football league pyramid, eventually gaining promotion to the Surrey County Intermediate League (Western). The Club progressed through the divisions and won the Middlesex Intermediate Cup in season 2000–01 and the Division One title in season 2001–02 (there was no Premier Division at the time).

In 2000–01 the Club completed the development of its new Sports Pavilion with the financial support of local businesses and grants from the Football Association and Sport England. It was a notable success at the time and represented the first such grant awarded by Sport England in the Borough of Spelthorne. Promotion to the Surrey County Senior League followed in season 2002–03.

In season 2003–04 the Surrey Senior League amalgamated with the Combined Counties Football League forming Division One, the existing clubs forming the Premier Division. The Club settled into mid-table security and at the start of the 2006–07 season following the appointment of Nathan Wharf as its manager (former manager of Ashford Town (Middx.) Football Club) success followed.

That season the Southern Combination Cup was shared with Merstham Football Club when a date for the Final could not be agreed. In season 2007–08 the club were champions of Division One and achieved the double in 2008-9 by retaining the title and winning the Division One League Cup.

Unable to be promoted to the Premier Division as it could not meet the necessary ground grading requirements having been refused planning permission to install floodlights, the Club at the start of the 2009–10 season entered into a ground share with Ashford Town (Middx.) Football Club.

The Club entered the FA Vase for the first time in season 2010–11 and the FA Cup likewise in season 2011–12, reaching the first qualifying round losing 3–2 in a thrilling match away to Chesham United.

In season 2011–12 the Club achieved more silverware when it won both the Middlesex and Surrey County Football Associations Saturday Premier Cups a unique feat in modern times.

After careful consideration the Club decided to return its former home at the Recreation Ground, Laleham at the start of the 2015–16 season.
In 2020 the club received planning permission for its long quest of obtaining floodlights.

Ground
Staines & Lammas (Middlesex) FC play their home games at The Laleham Recreation Ground, The Broadway, Laleham, TW18 1RZ

Honours
Combined Counties Football League Division One
Champions 2007–08, 2008–09
Surrey FA Saturday Premier Cup :
Winners 2011–12
Combined Counties Football League Division One Cup:
 Runners-up (1): 2012–13

Records
FA Cup
First Qualifying Round 2011–12
FA Vase
First Qualifying Round 2010–11, 2011–12

References

External links
Official site

Football clubs in Surrey
Staines-upon-Thames
1926 establishments in England
Association football clubs established in 1926
Football clubs in England
Surrey County Intermediate League (Western)
Surrey County Senior League
Combined Counties Football League